Stephen Paul Keirn (born September 10, 1951) is an American retired professional wrestler. He is best known for his appearances in multiple National Wrestling Alliance territories as Steve Keirn as one-half of the tag team The Fabulous Ones, as well as his appearances with the World Wrestling Federation under the ring name Skinner.

Early life 
Keirn graduated from Robinson High School in Port Tampa.  His father, Richard Keirn, was a B-17 pilot who was shot down over Germany in September 1944 and became a POW.  In July 1965, when Stephen was 13, Richard was shot down over Vietnam and again taken prisoner.  He was held in the Hanoi Hilton for seven and half years.  While his father was imprisoned he hung out with his school friend Mike Graham whose father Eddie Graham is in the WWE Hall of Fame.

Professional wrestling career

Championship Wrestling from Florida (1972–1982)
Much of Keirn's early career was spent wrestling as part of a tag team. While wrestling in Championship Wrestling from Florida (CWF), he held the NWA Florida Tag Team Championship twelve times; once each with Bob Backlund, Jimmy Garvin, and  Brian Blair, and nine times with Mike Graham. In addition, the team of Keirn and Graham won the NWA Florida United States Tag Team Championship three times.

In 1980 and 1981, Keirn focused on his career as a singles wrestler. He won many titles in Florida and Georgia, including the NWA World Junior Heavyweight Title by defeating Chavo Guerrero Sr. This title reign was recognized by New Japan Pro-Wrestling, as well as the Los Angeles and Florida NWA territories, but not by the NWA as a whole, which considered the title vacant and held a tournament to crown a new champion. The title Keirn held was later renamed the NWA International Junior Heavyweight Title. Keirn also won the NWA National Television Championship twice, defeating Terry Funk and Kevin Sullivan.

Various Promotions (1981–1991)
In 1981, Keirn began wrestling with the Tennessee-based Continental Wrestling Association (CWA). He was successful as a singles wrestler, winning a tournament to claim the AWA Southern Heavyweight Championship. He also held the NWA Mid-America Heavyweight Championship on two occasions. As in CWF, Keirn found his greatest success in the tag team division. He held the AWA Southern Tag Team Championship 17 times, including 14 reigns as one half of The Fabulous Ones with Stan Lane. Keirn and Lane also teamed to win the CWA World Tag Team Championship twice.

The Fabulous Ones competed in various promotions over the next decade. In 1984, the team won the Southwest Championship Wrestling World Tag Team Championship while wrestling in Australia. In the United States, they won the NWA Florida United States Tag Team Championship twice. In 1991, the pair wrestled in the United States Wrestling Association, defeating Tony Anthony and Doug Gilbert to win the USWA Tag Team Championship.

World Wrestling Federation (1991–1993)
In the summer of 1991, Keirn debuted in the WWF as Skinner, an alligator hunter from the Florida Everglades. He was portrayed as a generally nasty individual, always chewing on tobacco and sometimes spitting it on his opponent. He carried an alligator claw to the ring with him, which he would often use as a weapon against his opponents. He competed in the 1991 King of the Ring tournament, defeating Virgil in the first round but losing to Bret Hart in the second round. While still being billed as undefeated, he challenged Hart for the WWF Intercontinental Championship at This Tuesday in Texas on December 3, 1991, but lost by submission. Skinner competed in the 1992 Royal Rumble, lasting 2:13 before being eliminated by Rick Martel. At WrestleMania VIII, he was defeated in one minute and eleven seconds by Owen Hart.

Keirn also unsuccessfully challenged Randy Savage for the WWF Championship on the June 29, episode of Prime Time Wrestling. He also competed in the 1993 Royal Rumble, but was eliminated by Mr. Perfect at the 3:05 mark. While in the WWF, Keirn also portrayed Doink the Clown on occasion. At WrestleMania IX, Keirn helped the original Doink defeat Crush by attacking Crush dressed as Doink during the match.

World Championship Wrestling (1994)
Along with Bobby Eaton, Keirn wrestled in World Championship Wrestling (WCW) in 1994 in a tag team known as "Bad Attitude". Despite the tag team success both Keirn and Eaton enjoyed in the past (with The Fabulous Ones and the Midnight Express respectively), the team made little impact, losing dark matches to Brian and Brad Armstrong at Bash at the Beach 1994 and Fall Brawl 1994. While in WCW, Keirn was also involved in an angle in which masked men attacked Hulk Hogan. Several times in October 1994, Keirn wore a black mask to attack Hogan during and after Hogan's matches.

Retirement and post-career (2001–present) 
Since the late 1980s, Keirn has run a school to train wrestlers. Originally located in Tampa, Florida, Keirn's "Professional Wrestling School of Hard Knocks" is now located in Brandon, Florida. 
Keirn helped train many wrestlers, including Mike Awesome, Dennis Knight, Diamond Dallas Page, Dustin Rhodes, Tracy Smothers, and Roman Reigns.
The school was incorporated into the WWE's developmental territory, Florida Championship Wrestling, which opened on June 26, 2007, and Keirn was named President of the FCW and made regular appearances on FCW television. His last match was on December 10, 2007, at the 15th Anniversary Raw participating in a Battle Royal where he was eliminated from the match by Sgt. Slaughter.  On August 14, 2012, FCW was discontinued and the WWE Performance Center opened on July 11, 2013.

Autobiography
On March 10, 2023, Keirn's autobiography, The Keirn Chronicles Volume One: The Fabulous Wrestling Life of Steve Keirn, was released. The book is coauthored by Ian Douglass, a contributor to the autobiographies of Dan Severn, Hornswoggle, Bugsy McGraw and Brian Blair, and it includes forewords from Stan Lane and CM Punk, and an afterword from Natalya Neidhart.

Championships and accomplishments
Century Wrestling Alliance
CWA Television Championship (1 time)
Championship Wrestling from Florida
NWA Brass Knuckles Championship (Florida version) (1 time)
NWA Florida Heavyweight Championship (5 times)
NWA Florida Tag Team Championship (12 times) – with Mike Graham (9), Jimmy Garvin (1), Bob Backlund (1), and Brian Blair (1)
NWA Florida Television Championship (1 time)
NWA North America Tag Team Championship (Florida version) (1 time) – with Mike Graham
NWA Southern Heavyweight Championship (Florida version) (2 times)
NWA United States Tag Team Championship (Florida version) (5 times) – with Mike Graham (3) and Stan Lane (2)
Georgia Championship Wrestling
NWA Georgia Heavyweight Championship (1 time)
NWA Georgia Tag Team Championship (1 time) – with Mr. Wrestling
NWA National Television Championship (2 times)
 Gulf Coast Championship Wrestling
NWA United States Tag Team Championship (Gulf Coast version) (1 time) – with Ricky Gibson
NWA Hollywood Wrestling
NWA International Junior Heavyweight Championship (1 time)
NWA Mid-America / Continental Wrestling Association
AWA Southern Heavyweight Championship (1 time)
AWA Southern Tag Team Championship (17 times) – with Stan Lane (14), Bill Dundee (2), and Terry Taylor (1)
CWA International Tag Team Championship (1 time) – with Mark Starr
CWA World Tag Team Championship (2 times) – with Stan Lane
NWA Mid-America Heavyweight Championship (2 times)
Pro Wrestling Illustrated
PWI ranked him #132 of the top 500 singles wrestlers of the "PWI Years" in 2003
Southwest Championship Wrestling
SCW World Tag Team Championship (1 time) – with Stan Lane
United States Wrestling Association
USWA World Tag Team Championship (1 time) – with Stan Lane

See also
 The Fabulous Ones

References

External links
 
 
 

1951 births
20th-century professional wrestlers
21st-century professional wrestlers
American male professional wrestlers
Living people
Professional wrestlers from Florida
Professional wrestling promoters
Professional wrestling trainers
Sportspeople from Tampa, Florida
NWA International Junior Heavyweight Champions
NWA Florida Heavyweight Champions
NWA Florida Tag Team Champions
NWA Florida Television Champions
NWA North American Tag Team Champions (Florida version)
NWA Southern Heavyweight Champions (Florida version)
NWA Brass Knuckles Champions (Florida version)
NWA United States Tag Team Champions (Florida version)
NWA Georgia Heavyweight Champions
NWA Georgia Tag Team Champions
NWA National Television Champions